William Michael Stankewicz (born 1946) is a former teacher who attacked educators and children at North Hopewell-Winterstown Elementary School in Red Lion, Pennsylvania in 2001. Stankewicz attacked 11 kindergarteners, two teachers and the principal with a machete. He said he attacked the victims because he was angry about his divorce and allegations he had molested his stepdaughters.

Principal Norina Bentzel stopped the attack by jumping on Stankewicz and pinning him down, despite having been severely injured by hits from the machete.

On February 2, 2001, Stankewicz drove from his home in Johnson City, Tennessee to York County. Along the way he tried to buy a gun, but failed the mandatory background check.

References

Place of birth missing (living people)
American people convicted of attempted murder
Living people
People from Red Lion, Pennsylvania
1946 births